The FIU Panthers men's basketball team represents Florida International University in Westchester, Florida. The school's team currently competes in Conference USA. They are led by head coach Jeremy Ballard and play their home games at the Ocean Bank Convocation Center.

Richard Pitino era 
On April 15, 2012, Richard Pitino left his position as the associate head coach at the University of Louisville to become the head coach at FIU. With only six players remaining from the previous season, and not all of them on scholarship, Pitino cobbled together a team and coached a high-pressure defense that finished eighth in the nation in steals. He was able to compile an 18-14 record (11-9 in the Sun Belt conference) in his only season as head coach. His FIU team set a record for the best conference record in school history. Additionally, FIU reached the Sun Belt tournament championship game as a four seed, before falling to Western Kentucky, 65-63.

On April 3, 2013, Richard Pitino was hired to become the next head coach at the University of Minnesota, replacing Tubby Smith.

Anthony Evans era 
On April 15, 2013, Anthony Evans left his position as head coach at Norfolk State University to become the head coach at FIU.

On April 2, 2018, FIU fired Evans after 5 seasons, in which the Panthers finished 65-94 with no postseason tournament appearances.

Jeremy Ballard era 
On April 20, 2018, VCU associate head coach Jeremy Ballard was hired by the Panthers for the head coaching job.

NCAA Tournament appearances 
FIU men's basketball team had its lone NCAA Tournament appearance in the 1995 tournament under then Head Coach Bob Weltlich, who had already announced his resignation following the season. FIU won the TAAC Basketball Tournament and in doing so earned an automatic bid for the NCAA tournament, and in doing so became the worst team to receive a bid in it’s history. FIU was seeded #16 and played the #1 seeded UCLA Bruins in the first round of the West Regional, which was played at the Taco Bell Arena in Boise. The Panthers lost the game to the Bruins by the score of 92–56, being the first tournament win in UCLA's successful run to the National Championship that year. Weltlich notably said during the post-game interview, "If anyone knows of any openings out there, my number is...".

Media appearances 
The "Sunblazers" men’s basketball team was also featured in a second-season episode of Miami Vice entitled "The Fix".

Postseason

NCAA tournament results 

The Panthers have appeared in one NCAA tournament. Their record is 0–1.

CIT Results
The Panthers have appeared in the CollegeInsider.com Postseason Tournament (CIT) one time. Their record is 1-1.

Year-by-year results

Records

Team Honors 

NCAA tournament Appearances (1): 1995

Trans America Athletic Conference tournament champions (1): 1995
Trans America Athletic Conference regular season champions (1): 1992–93

FIU basketball alumni in professional leagues

FIU Panthers alumni to have gone on to the NBA and international professional basketball.

 Oren Aharoni (born 1973), Israeli basketball coach and former basketball player in the Israeli Basketball Premier League

References

External links